The 2004 United States presidential election in North Dakota took place on November 2, 2004, and was part of the 2004 United States presidential election. Voters chose three representatives, or electors to the Electoral College, who voted for president and vice president.

North Dakota was won by incumbent President George W. Bush by a 27.36% margin of victory. Prior to the election, all 12 news organizations considered this a state Bush would win, or otherwise considered as a safe red state. The state has voted Republican in all but five presidential elections since statehood. In 2004, George W. Bush defeated John Kerry with 62.86% of the vote. Even As Incumbent Democratic Senator Byron Dorgan overwhelmingly  Won re- election to the senate on the same ballot. The state's population of about 650,000 is little changed from what it was 80 years ago, as North Dakota is one of seven states with the minimum three electoral votes.

Caucuses
 2004 North Dakota Democratic presidential caucuses

Campaign

Predictions
There were 12 news organizations who made state-by-state predictions of the election. Here are their last predictions before election day.

 D.C. Political Report: Solid Republican
 Associated Press: Solid Bush
 CNN: Bush
Cook Political Report: Solid Republican
 Newsweek: Solid Bush
New York Times: Solid Bush
 Rasmussen Reports: Bush
 Research 2000: Solid Bush
Washington Post: Bush
Washington Times: Solid Bush
Zogby International: Bush
 Washington Dispatch: Bush

Polling
Bush won both pre-election polls with a double-digit margin.

Fundraising
Bush raised $135,493. Kerry raised $36,600.

Advertising and visits
Neither campaign visited or advertised in this state during the fall campaign.

Analysis
In 2000, Al Gore won two counties, compared to Kerry who won four counties in the state, including his best performance in Sioux County, where he won with seventy percent of the vote. Overall, Bush dominated the state, winning a wide majority of the state's counties, and with large margins. In just two counties – both majority Native American – did Bush obtain less than 44 percent of the vote. As of 2020, this is the last election in which the Republican nominee won Cass County by majority.

Results

Results by county

Counties that flipped from Republican to Democratic
Benson (Largest CDP: Fort Totten)
Steele (Largest city: Finley)

By congressional district
Due to the state's low population, only one congressional district is allocated. This district is called the At-Large district, because it covers the entire state, and thus is equivalent to the statewide election results.

Electors

Technically the voters of ND cast their ballots for electors: representatives to the Electoral College. ND is allocated 3 electors because it has 1 congressional district and 2 senators. All candidates who appear on the ballot or qualify to receive write-in votes must submit a list of 3 electors, who pledge to vote for their candidate and his or her running mate. Whoever wins the majority of votes in the state is awarded all 3 electoral votes. Their chosen electors then vote for president and vice president. Although electors are pledged to their candidate and running mate, they are not obligated to vote for them. An elector who votes for someone other than his or her candidate is known as a faithless elector.

The electors of each state and the District of Columbia met on December 13, 2004, to cast their votes for president and vice president. The Electoral College itself never meets as one body. Instead the electors from each state and the District of Columbia met in their respective capitols.

The following were the members of the Electoral College from the state. All were pledged to and voted for Bush and Cheney:
 Betsy Dalrymple (wife of Jack Dalrymple)
Ben Clayburgh
 Jackie Williams

See also
 United States presidential elections in North Dakota
 Presidency of George W. Bush

Notes

References

North Dakota
2004
Presidential